Carlos Lemos may refer to:

Carlos Lemos (fighter), Brazilian martial artist
Carlos Lemos (actor) (1909–1988), Spanish actor
Carlos Lemos (athlete) (born 1988), Colombian sprinter
Carlos Lemos (film editor), Argentine film editor
Carlos Lemos Simmonds (1933–2003), 6th Vice President of Colombia
Guinga (Carlos Althier de Souza Lemos Escobar, born 1950), Brazilian musician